Stollings is an unincorporated community and census-designated place (CDP) in central Logan County, West Virginia, United States. As of the 2010 census, it had a population of 316.

Geography

In addition to the two state highways that serve the community (WV 10 and WV 10), the entire length of West Virginia Route 17 Truck (a short  bypass for a low railroad overpass near the southern terminus of WV 17) is located within Stollings.

The CDP is situated immediately southeast of the city of Logan and north of the CDP of McConnell. Stollings has a post office with ZIP code 25646.

Stollings sits at the confluence of Dingess Run with the Guyandotte River.

See also

 List of census-designated places in West Virginia

References

External links

Census-designated places in Logan County, West Virginia
Census-designated places in West Virginia
Populated places on the Guyandotte River